Gary Jason Bocaling Ejercito (born May 16, 1971), better known as Gary Estrada, is a television and film actor in the Philippines. He was a former talent of Viva Films during his early years, starring in action and drama films. He is also a politician, having served as a Board Member of Quezon's 2nd District from 2010 to 2016.

Personal life
Ejercito was born on May 16, 1971, in the Philippines to actor Jorge M. Ejercito ("George Estregan"). He is the half-brother of Emilio Ramon Ejercito and Gherome Ejercito.

He is married to Bernadette Allyson with whom he has three daughters, Garielle Bernice, Garianna Beatrice and Gianna Bettina. He has one son Kiko Estrada from a previous relationship with actress Cheska Diaz. He was in an on-and-off relationship with then-fellow Viva artist Donita Rose from 1993 to 1997.

Filmography

Film
Tiny Terrestrial: The Three Professors (1990)
Boyong Mañalac: Hoodlum Terminator (1991) 
Angelito San Miguel at ang Mga Batang City Jail (1992) 
Jesus dela Cruz at ang Mga Batang Riles (1992) 
Tag-araw, Tag-ulan (1992) 
Apoy sa Puso (1992) 
Blue Jeans Gang (1992) 
Kapag Iginuhit ang Hatol sa Puso (1993) 
Hanggang Saan... Hanggang Kailan (1993) 
Parañaque Bank Robbery (Joselito Yuseco Story) (1993) 
Bratpack (Mga Pambayad Atraso) (1994) 
Kadenang Bulaklak (1994) 
Pangako ng Kahapon (1994) 
Anghel Na Walang Langit (1994)
Campus Girls (1994) 
Joe D'Mango's Lovenotes, the Movie (1995)
Jessica Alfaro Story (1995) 
The Grepor Butch Belgica Story (1995) 
Dyesebel (1996) 
Ober da Bakod 2 (Da Treasure Adbentyur) (1996) 
Dead Sure (1996) 
Do Re Mi (1996) 
Ikaw Naman ang Iiyak (1996) 
Strict ang Peyrents Ko (1997)
Bayan Puri (1999)
Pagnanasa (1998)
Dibdiban ang Laban (1999)
Sutla (1999)
Mamang Shotgun (1999)
Mister Mo, Lover Ko (1999)
Gamugamong Dagat (1999)
Senswal (2000)
Madame X (2000)
Waray (2000)
Garapal (2000)
Duwag Lang ang Sumusuko! (2001)
Booba (2001)
Oras Na para Lumaban (2001)
Masarap Na Pugad (2002)
Gising Na si Adan (2002)
You and Me Against the World (2003)
Sa Piling ng mga Belyas (2003)
www.XXX.com (2003)
El Presidente (2012)

Television

References

External links
GMA Television Network

Filipino male television actors
Living people
Filipino actor-politicians
Politicians from Quezon
Male actors from Quezon
Gary
Gary
Filipino male comedians
1971 births
Filipino male film actors
GMA Network personalities
ABS-CBN personalities